Marty Morgan (born August 12, 1966) is a former American wrestler. He was the 1991 NCAA National Champion (177 pounds; 39-0 record for season, the first wrestler ever in U of MN history to finish undefeated in his career) and a 3-time All-American in college.

Early life
Morgan wrestled at Kennedy High School in Bloomington, Minnesota.

College
Morgan first wrestled for one year at North Dakota State University, where he was a NCAA Division II National Champion as a freshman. Morgan then finished his collegiate career at the University of Minnesota where he was an undefeated NCAA Division I National Champion as a senior.

International
After college, Morgan won 2 US Open National Greco Titles and represented the US on the World Team in 1993 and 1995. He placed 2nd at the 1996 US Olympic Trials, losing in overtime to Dan Henderson.

In 2001, the Minnesota Wrestling Coaches Association inducted Morgan into the Dave Bartelma Hall of Fame.
In 2018, Morgan was inducted into the National Wrestling Hall of Fame.

References

1966 births
Living people
American male sport wrestlers
Sportspeople from Minneapolis
Minnesota Golden Gophers wrestlers